Tivela is a genus of saltwater clams, marine bivalve molluscs in the subfamily Meretricinae of the family Veneridae, the Venus clams.

Species
According to the World Register of Marine Species, the following species are included in the genus Tivela:
 Tivela argentina (G. B. Sowerby I, 1835)
 Tivela bicolor Gray
 Tivela byronensis (Gray, 1838)
 Tivela compressa  G.B. Sowerby II, 1851
 Tivela cora Römer, 1864
 Tivela damaoides (W. Wood, 1828)
 Tivela delessertii (G. B. Sowerby II, 1854)
 Tivela dentaria (Lamarck, 1818)
 Tivela dillwyni (Deshayes, 1853)
 Tivela dunkeri Römer, 1864
 Tivela fulminata (Bory de Saint-Vincent, 1827)
 Tivela geijskesi van Regteren Altena, 1968
 Tivela laevigata (J. E. Gray, 1838)
 Tivela lamyi Dautzenberg, 1929
 Tivela lessonii (Deshayes, 1830)
 Tivela lineata (G. B. Sowerby II, 1851)
 Tivela mactroides (Born, 1778)
 Tivela mulawana Biggs, 1969
 Tivela natalensis Dunker, 1858
 Tivela planulata (Broderip & G. B. Sowerby I, 1830)
 Tivela ponderosa (F.C.L. Koch in R.A. Philippi, 1844) 
 Tivela rejecta Smith, 1914
 Tivela stefaninii (Nardini, 1933)
 Tivela stultorum (Mawe, 1823)
 Tivela transversa (G. B. Sowerby III, 1897)
 Tivela trigonella (Lamarck, 1818)
 Tivela tripla (Linnaeus, 1767)
 Tivela valae Lussi, 1996
 Tivela zonaria (Lamarck, 1818)

Synonyms
 Tivela abaconis Dall, 1902: synonym of Tivela trigonella (Lamarck, 1818)
 Tivela brasiliana Dall, 1902: synonym of Tivela mactroides (Born, 1778)
 Tivela dolabella G.B. Sowerby II, 1851: synonym of Tivela damaoides (W. Wood, 1828)
 Tivela elegans A. E. Verrill, 1870: synonym of Tivela byronensis (Gray, 1838)
 Tivela floridana Rehder, 1939: synonym of Tivela trigonella (J.B.P.A. Lamarck, 1818) 
 Tivela foresti Fischer-Piette & Testud, 1967: synonym of Tivela fulminata (Bory de Saint-Vincent, 1827)
 Tivela hartvigii Dunker, 1879: synonym of Tivela compressa (G. B. Sowerby II, 1851)
 Tivela isabelleana (d'Orbigny, 1846): synonym of Tivela dentaria (Lamarck, 1818)
 Tivela petiti Dautzenberg, 1929: synonym of Tivela transversa (G. B. Sowerby III, 1897)
 Tivela platyaulax (Tomlin, 1924): synonym of Comus platyaulax (Tomlin, 1924)
 Tivela polita G.B. Sowerby II, 1851: synonym of Tivela planulata (Broderip & G. B. Sowerby I, 1830)
 Tivela plathyaulax (Tomlin, 1924): synonym of Comus platyaulax (Tomlin, 1924)
 Tivela rejecta E. A. Smith, 1914, sensu P. G. Oliver, 1995: synonym of Tivela damaoides (W. Wood, 1828) (misapplication)
 Tivela scarificata S. S. Berry, 1940: synonym of Tivela stultorum (Mawe, 1823)
 Tivela subglobosa Dunker, 1864: synonym of Tivela mactroides (Born, 1778) (junior subjective synonym)
 Tivela tomlini Haughton, 1932: synonym of Tivela compressa (G. B. Sowerby II, 1851)
 Tivela trigona Borchert, 1901: synonym of Tivela dentaria (Lamarck, 1818)
 Tivela ventricosa (Gray, 1838): synonym of Tivela zonaria (Lamarck, 1818)
 Tivela vulgaris Link, 1807: synonym of Tivela mactroides (Born, 1778)

References

External links
 Link, D.H.F. (1807-1808). Beschreibung der Naturalien-Sammlung der Universität zu Rostock. Adlers Erben. 1 Abt.
 Olsson, A. A. (1961). Mollusks of the tropical eastern Pacific, particularly from the southern half of the Panamic-Pacific faunal province (Panama to Peru). Panamic-Pacific Pelecypoda. Paleontological Research Institution, Ithaca. 574 pp, 86 pl
 Dall, W. H. (1891). On a new subgenus of Meretrix, with descriptions of two new species from Brazil. The Nautilus. 5(3): 26-29, 2 text-figures

Veneridae
Bivalve genera